Nilambazar College, established in 1994, is a general degree college situated at Nilambazar, in Karimganj district, Assam. This college is affiliated with the Assam University. This college offers higher secondary and bachelor's degree courses in arts.

References

External links

Universities and colleges in Assam
Colleges affiliated to Assam University
Educational institutions established in 1994
1994 establishments in Assam